Apples to Apples is a party game originally published by Out of the Box Publishing Inc., and now by Mattel. Players start with a hand of seven "red apple" cards, which feature nouns. A player is selected to be the first judge, and that judge plays a "green apple" card, which features an adjective. The round is won by playing the "red apple" card that the judge determines to be the best match for the "green apple" card. The role of the judge rotates, and the number of rounds is determined by the number of players. The game is designed for four to ten players and played for 30–75 minutes.

Apples to Apples was chosen by Mensa International in 1999 as a "Mensa Select" prizewinner, an award given to five games each year. It was also named "Party Game of the Year" in the December 1999 issue of Games magazine and received the National Parenting Center's seal of approval in May 1999. The popularity of the game led to an increased interest in similar card-matching/answer-judging party games. On September 8, 2007, Out of the Box Publishing sold the rights for Apples to Apples to Mattel.

Game versions

The original boxed set contained:

 One hundred eight green cards (green apples), each of which has an adjective printed on one side.
 Three hundred twenty-four red cards (red apples), each of which has a noun printed on one side.
 A tray for holding the cards.

Four expansion sets were available, adding 72 extra green apple cards and 216 additional red apple cards each. In 2002, Expansion Set 3 won the Origins Award for Best Card Game Expansion or Supplement of 2001. As of 2005[update], the original set and its expansions have been retired and replaced by a Party Box with the combined contents of the basic set and its first two expansions, and Party Box Expansion 1 set with the combined contents of the third and fourth expansions, and a Party Box Expansion 2, which contains new cards. Apples to Apples Junior, for ages nine and up, Apples to Apples Kids, for ages seven and up, and a variety of themed editions were also developed. Mattel has continued to update card sets and packaging and add themed editions.

Reception
In 2019, Apples to Apples was inducted into the Origins Award Hall of Fame.

See also
 Cards Against Humanity – a similar game, but oriented for an adult audience
 Dixit (card game)

References

External links
 Official site

Dedicated deck card games
Party games
Mensa Select winners
Origins Award winners
Mattel games
Card games introduced in 1999